The athletics competition at the 2017 Islamic Solidarity Games was held in Baku National Stadium in Baku, Azerbaijan from 16 to 20 May 2017.

Medal summary

Men

Women

Para Athletics Men

Para Athletics Women

Medal table

References

External links 
Results
Official YouTube channel

2017
Islamic Solidarity Games
2017 Islamic Solidarity Games
2017 Islamic Solidarity Games